Jasper van den Bos (1634, Hoorn – in or shortly after 1656, Hoorn) was a Dutch Golden Age marine painter.

According to Houbraken his father was a ship's carpenter and he was trained as such, but turned his hand to painting marines, which he was very good at.
He died young, but left quite a collection of drawings that could be admired in Hoorn at the home of the painter Johannes van Bronckhorst and elsewhere.

According to the RKD he painted seascapes and harbor scenes, but also made Italianate landscapes in albums.

References

External links
Jasper van den Bos on Artnet

1634 births
1656 deaths
Dutch Golden Age painters
Dutch male painters
Dutch marine artists
People from Hoorn